Luigi Furlan (born 22 June 1963) is an Italian former professional racing cyclist. He rode in the 1986 Tour de France.

References

External links

1963 births
Living people
Italian male cyclists
Cyclists from Geneva